Hypocalymma phillipsii is a member of the family Myrtaceae endemic to Western Australia.

It blooms between September and November producing cream-white-pink flowers.

It is found in a small area on hill slopes in the Great Southern region of Western Australia centred around the Stirling Range where it grows in sandy-peaty soils.

References

phillipsii
Endemic flora of Western Australia
Rosids of Western Australia
Vulnerable flora of Australia
Plants described in 1858